Moszczenica may refer to the following places:
Moszczenica, Bochnia County in Lesser Poland Voivodeship (south Poland)
Moszczenica, Piotrków County in Łódź Voivodeship (central Poland)
Moszczenica, Zgierz County in Łódź Voivodeship (central Poland)
Moszczenica, Gorlice County in Lesser Poland Voivodeship (south Poland)
Moszczenica, Pomeranian Voivodeship (north Poland)
Moszczenica, Jastrzębie-Zdrój in Silesian Voivodeship (south Poland)
Moszczenica (river) in Łódź Voivodeship (central Poland)